Martić is a Croatian surname. Notable people with the surname include:
 Grga Martić, Croatian writer
 Milan Martić, Croatian politician
 Petra Martić, Croatian tennis player
 Tonči Martić, Croatian former footballer

See also
 Maretić

Croatian surnames
Patronymic surnames
Serbian surnames
Surnames from given names